Josephine Hutchinson (October 12, 1903 – June 4, 1998) was an American actress. She acted in dozens of theater plays and dozens of films, including Son of Frankenstein and North by Northwest, as well as numerous television appearances as guest star in various series including The Twilight Zone.

Early years

Hutchinson was born in Seattle, Washington. Her mother, Leona Roberts, was an actress best known for her role as Mrs. Meade in Gone with the Wind.

Career

Film 
Through her mother's connections, Hutchinson made her film debut at the age of 13 in The Little Princess (1917), starring Mary Pickford. She later attended the Cornish School in Seattle, receiving a diploma in 1929. She moved to New York City, where she began acting in theater. By the late 1920s, she was one of the actors able to make the transition from silent movies to talkies.

Under contract with Warner Bros., Hutchinson went to Hollywood in 1934, debuting in Happiness Ahead. She was featured on the cover of Film Weekly on August 23, 1935 and appeared in The Story of Louis Pasteur in 1936.

At Universal, she played the leading lady, Elsa von Frankenstein, in one of her more memorable roles alongside actors Basil Rathbone, Boris Karloff and Bela Lugosi in Son of Frankenstein (1939). In 1957's Gun for a Coward, she was miscast as the mother of Fred MacMurray's character, being less than five years MacMurray's senior. She later played the sister of the villain Vandamm, posing as Mrs. Townsend, in North by Northwest (1959) and Mrs. Macaboy in Love Is Better Than Ever, starring Elizabeth Taylor.

Stage 
Hutchinson's Broadway debut came in The Bird Cage (1925). Her other Broadway credits included The Cherry Orchard (1933), Alice in Wonderland (1932), Dear Jane (1932), Alison's House (1931), Camille (1931), Alison's House (1930), The Women Have Their Way (1930), The Living Corpse (1929), Mademoiselle Bourrat (1929), The Cherry Orchard (1929), The Seagull (1929), Peter Pan (1928), The Cherry Orchard (1928), Hedda Gabler (1928), Improvisations in June (1928), The First Stone (1928), 2 x 2 = 5 (1927), The Good Hope (1927), Inheritors (1927), The Cradle Song (1927), Twelfth Night (1926), The Unchastened Woman (1926), and A Man's Man (1925).

Television 
On television, she made four guest appearances on Perry Mason. In 1958, she played Leona Walsh in "The Case of the Screaming Woman".
In 1959, she played murderer Miriam Baker in "The Case of the Spanish Cross". In 1961, she played Miss Sarah McKay in "The Case of the Barefaced Witness", and in 1962, she played Amelia Corning in "The Case of the Mystified Miner".

In the 1960 The Rifleman episode "The Prodigal", she played Christine, the mother of outlaw Billy St. John.

In 1970 Bonanza (S12E9) "Love Child", she played Martha Randolph.

In Little House on the Prairie (S1E6) "If I Should Wake Before I Die", she played Amy Hearn.

Hutchinson continued to work steadily through the 1970s in film, radio, and television, establishing a solid career in supporting roles. She appeared in The Real McCoys in 1961 in the episode "September Song", on Rawhide in 1962 in the episode "Grandma's Money", The Twilight Zone in the episode "I Sing the Body Electric", and Gunsmoke as “Mrs Crale” in the 1959 episode “Johnny Red”, and as “Reverend Mother Sister Ellen” in the 1967 episode “Ladies From St. Louis”.  In 1971, Hutchinson appeared in The Waltons television movie The Homecoming: A Christmas Story, in which she played Mamie Baldwin, one half of a sister duo who made moonshine whiskey.

Personal life
On August 12, 1924, Hutchinson married Robert W. Bell, a stage director, in Washington, D.C. In 1926, she met the actress Eva Le Gallienne, and became a member of Le Gallienne's Civic Repertory Theatre company. By 1927, the two women were involved in an affair and Hutchinson and Bell, who separated in 1928, were divorced in 1930. The press quickly dubbed her Le Gallienne's "shadow", a term which at the time meant lesbian. Both actresses survived the scandal and carried on with their respective careers.

Hutchinson married three times. Hutchinson married James F. Townsend in 1935; they later divorced. Her final marriage was to actor Staats Cotsworth in 1972; he died in 1979.

Death
She died, aged 94, on June 4, 1998, at the Florence Nightingale Nursing Home in Manhattan. Her ashes were scattered near her niece's home at Springfield, Oregon.

Select filmography

 The Little Princess (1917) (uncredited) 
 Happiness Ahead (1934) as Joan Bradford
 The Right to Live (1935) as Stella Trent
 Oil for the Lamps of China (1935) as Hester
 The Melody Lingers On (1935) as Ann Prescott
 The Story of Louis Pasteur (1936) as Marie Pasteur
 I Married a Doctor (1936) as Carol Kennicott
 Mountain Justice (1937) as Ruth Harkins
 The Women Men Marry (1937) as Jane Carson
 The Crime of Doctor Hallet (1938) as Dr. Mary Reynolds
 Son of Frankenstein (1939) as Elsa Von Frankenstein
 My Son, My Son! (1940) as Nellie (Moscrop) Essex
 Tom Brown's School Days (1940) as Mrs. Mary Arnold
 Her First Beau (1941) as Mrs. Wood
 Somewhere in the Night (1946) as Elizabeth Conroy
 Cass Timberlane (1947) as Lillian Drover
 The Tender Years (1948) as Emily Norris
 Adventure in Baltimore (1949) as Mrs. Lilly Sheldon
 Love Is Better Than Ever (1952) as Mrs. Macaboy
 Ruby Gentry (1952) as Letitia Gentry
 Many Rivers to Cross (1955) as Mrs. Cherne
 Miracle in the Rain (1956) as Agnes Wood
 Gun for a Coward (1957) as Mrs. Keough
 Sing, Boy, Sing (1958) as Caroline Walker
 Step Down to Terror (1958) as Mrs. Sarah Walters
 North by Northwest (1959) as Mrs. Townsend
 Walk Like a Dragon (1960) as Ma Bartlett
 The Adventures of Huckleberry Finn (1960) as Widow Douglas
 Baby the Rain Must Fall (1965) as Mrs. Ewing
 Nevada Smith (1966) as Mrs. Elvira McCanles
 Rabbit, Run (1970) as Mrs. Angstrom, Rabbit's mother
 The Homecoming: A Christmas Story (1971) as Mamie Baldwin

References

External links
 
 
 

1903 births
1998 deaths
Actresses from Seattle
American film actresses
American stage actresses
American television actresses
Bisexual actresses
Bisexual women
LGBT people from Washington (state)
Warner Bros. contract players
20th-century American actresses
20th-century American LGBT people
American LGBT actors